The 1937–38 season was the seventh season of competitive association football in the Football League played by Chester, an English club based in Chester, Cheshire.

It was the club's seventh consecutive season in the Third Division North since the election to the Football League. Alongside competing in the league, the club also participated in the FA Cup and the Welsh Cup.

Football League

Results summary

Results by matchday

Matches

FA Cup

Chester along with Millwall and Notts County were given a bye to the Third round.

Welsh Cup

Season statistics

References

1937-38
English football clubs 1937–38 season